The DB Class 610 is a Diesel Multiple Unit (DMU) train type operated by the Deutsche Bahn in Germany. They were built from 1991 to 1992 by MAN and Duewag. The class uses a tilting Hydraulic Fiat system used in Italian Pendolino trains.

General Information
The trains were ordered for the Nürnberg to Hof, Bayreuth and Regensburg routes which include a large number of curves. The units worked well from 1992 to 2000 when cracks in the bogies meant they had to be taken out of service. The wheelsets were replaced and they were back in service in 2001.

Liveries
The class now all wear the DB Red livery.

Services
The class are used on services around Nürnberg to Regensburg, Hof and Bayreuth.

References

Citations

See also
 610 002 in DB Red
 A 610 at Neustadt

Diesel multiple units of Germany